Strongylodon is a genus of flowering plants in the legume family, Fabaceae. It belongs to the subfamily Faboideae. The most well-known species of this genus is Strongylodon macrobotrys, also known as jade vine.

Taxonomy 
The genus is named by Asa Gray in 1854 describing the jade vine discovered a decade earlier by members of the United States Exploring Expedition led by U.S. Navy Lt. Charles Wilkes in Mount Makiling, Luzon; although Gray did not join the voyage himself. The genus name derives from strongylos "round", and odous "tooth", referring to the rounded teeth of the jade vine's calyx.

Species
 Strongylodon archboldianus Merr. & L.M.Perry
 Strongylodon caeruleus Merr.
 Strongylodon celebicus Huang
 Strongylodon crassifolius Perkins
 Strongylodon craveniae R.Baron & Baker
 Strongylodon decipiens Verdc.
 Strongylodon elmeri Merr.
 Strongylodon loheri Huang
 Strongylodon lucidus (G.Forst.) Seem.
 Strongylodon macrobotrys A.Gray
 Strongylodon madagascariensis Baker
 Strongylodon pulcher C.B.Rob.
 Strongylodon ruber Vogel
 Strongylodon zschokkei Elmer

References

External links 
 About.com Houseplant Guide: Jade Vine—growing Strongylodon inside
Strongylodon lucidus (G.Forst.) Seem. lucidcentral.org

Phaseoleae
Fabaceae genera